Gastrolobium villosum (common name crinkle-leaf poison or crinkle-leaved poison) is a low spreading shrub in the pea family (Fabaceae), native to Western Australia. Like most Gastrolobiums it is poisonous to stock.

It was first described by George Bentham in 1839. There are no synonyms.

It is deemed to be "Not Threatened" under Western Australian conservation law.

Etymology 
The specific epithet, villosum, is a Latin adjective, villosus, -a, -um ("villous") and describes the plant as having "long, soft, straight (not interwoven) hairs".

References

External links 

 Gastrolobium villosum occurrence data from Australasian Virtual Herbarium

Plants described in 1839
Taxa named by George Bentham
villosum